Rhodanthe, also known as sunray or pink paper daisy, is a genus of Australian plants in the tribe Gnaphalieae within the family Asteraceae.

The name Rhodanthe is derived from Greek rhodon, rose and anthos, flower.

Many Rhodanthe species were formerly classed under different genera, including Helipterum,  Podotheca, Acroclinium and Waitzia.

 Species

References

 
Asteraceae genera
Endemic flora of Australia